Joseph Adamik (born 1972 in Chicago, IL) is a musician and composer best known for his involvement with the bands Califone and Iron & Wine.  He has also performed since the early 1990s with many Chicago jazz musicians as well as recording and performing with many other groups across different genres.

With Califone 
Adamik joined Califone after the debut album Roomsound in 2000, playing many instruments on Quicksand/Cradlesnakes and went on to be a foundational member till 2013.  Masserella and Adamik created a unique melodic approach with traditional drums and found objects such as chunks of metal.

With Iron & Wine 
In 2010, after recording on the Iron & Wine album, Kiss Each Other Clean, Adamik joined Iron & Wine and performed and recorded with the band till 2018.

Jazz 
Joe has performed at the Hungry Brain, Beat Kitchen, Old Town School of Folk Music, and Constellation

Other work 
Adamik has also performed from a young age with many jazz artists, most notably as a member of pianist Bob Dogan's trio and quintet. He is also a rotating member of the experimental group, Extraordinary Popular Delusions.  He also leads his own solo projects as well as the group Madness of Crowds (with Jim Baker and Brian Sandstrom from Extraordinary Popular Delusions) and the duo with former Califone bandmate, Jim Becker, entitled Lanzon.

Education 
Attending Glenbard South High School in Glen Ellen, IL, Adamik went on to study music at Roosevelt University's Chicago Musical College, leaving to pursue full time music employment, but finishing his music degree from Northeastern Illinois University in 2019.  He also has a degree in economics from Northeastern Illinois University.

Discography

Solo recordings 
 Super Low (2014)

Group recordings

Califone 
 Deceleration One (2002)
 Quicksand/Cradlesnakes (2003)
 Deceleration Two (2003)
 Heron King Blues (2004)
 Roots & Crowns (2006)
 All My Friends Are Funeral Singers (2009))

Iron & Wine 
 Kiss Each Other Clean (2010)
 Sing into My Mouth (2015) *(with Ben Bridwell)
 Beast Epic (2017)
 Weed Garden (2018)

Lanzon 
 Lanzon (2020)

Margo and the Nuclear So & So’s 
 Buzzard (2010)

John Vanderslice 
 The Cedars (2019)

Manishevitz
 City Life (2003)

The Singleman Affair
 Silhouettes At Dawn (2011)

The Fire Show
 Saint the Fire Show (2002)

Flecton Big Sky
 The Bright Side of Dying (2008)

Orso
 Ask Your Neighbor (2008)

Terra Naomi
 Secret Songs (2018)

Madness of Crowds
 Tulips (2019)

Peabody & Sherman
 Gasoline Rainbows (2019)

Adam Busch
 River of Bricks (2015)

Light Industry
 Light Industry (2016)

for Standard Recording Company
 Of Great and Mortal Men: 43 Songs for 43 U.S. Presidencies (2008)

Denty/Westlake
 Etched (2003)

References 

1972 births
Living people
American composers
American male composers
Chicago Musical College alumni
Northeastern Illinois University alumni